Vices is the debut studio album by English heavy metal band Waysted, released in October 1983 by Chrysalis Records.

Track listing

Personnel
Waysted
Fin Muir - lead vocals
Ronnie Kayfield - lead guitar, backing vocals
Paul Raymond - rhythm guitar, keyboards, backing vocals, mixing
Pete Way - bass guitar, mixing
Frank Noon - drums

Production
Mick Glossop - producer, engineer, mixing at Maison Rouge and The Townhouse, London
Dave Chapman - assistant engineer
John Pasche - cover design

Charts

Album

References

1983 debut albums
Chrysalis Records albums
Waysted albums